Mumbo sauce or mambo sauce is a condiment developed and popularized in Washington, D.C. take-out restaurants.  The red-orange sauce is similar to barbecue sauce, but somewhat sweeter, and also somewhat spicier or more sour.  (There is some variation in flavor and consistency.)  It is put onto fried chicken wings, french fries, fried jumbo shrimp, and fried rice. The origin and ingredients of Mumbo sauce are subject to great dispute. It is often compared to Chicago mild sauce, found at take-out restaurants in that city’s predominantly Black neighborhoods.

History
The trademark Mumbo name was first used by Argia B. Collins Sr., for use in connection with a barbecue sauce he developed for his Chicago restaurant. Since at least as early as 1950, Mr. Collins and his business used this trademark, and his successor-in-interest, Select Brands, LLC, registered the trademark with the U.S. Patent and Trademark Office on May 25, 1999, Registration No. 2,247,855. The Mumbo trademark has been used for sauces, and appears on labels as part of the phrase Mumbo® Sauce.

Some people have used the term "Mumbo Sauce" in articles, internet blogs and advertisements for their sauce products, in connection with a sauce said to have originated in Washington, DC Chinese restaurants used on chicken wings, French fries, and fried rice.  Select Brands has challenged such uses as incorrect and as potential infringements of its Mumbo trademark.

However, according to Capital City Mumbo Sauce, the sauce originated in a restaurant called "Wings-n-Things" in the late 1960s. Since Argia's Mumbo Sauce can be traced back to the 1950s (before it showed up at Wings-N-Things) it's speculated that the DC version is a transplanted version of the original Chicago sauce. Recently, after two years of court battles, the Trademark Trial and Appeal Board found that a D.C.-based company could not take the name from its Chicago founder.

In 2018, DC Mayor Muriel Bowser drew national attention when she called Mumbo Sauce "annoying" in a Facebook post. She also questioned whether it was "quintessential" DC. Her comments sparked controversy, while her spokesperson said that her remarks were meant to liven Thanksgiving discussions.

Cultural references

 The DC go-go group Mambo Sauce derived their name from the condiment.
 The DC hip-hop artist Christylez Bacon performs a song about Mambo sauce.
 Black Flag Brewing Co., a brewery in Columbia, MD has a beer named Mambo Sauce after the sauce.
 Writer Camille Acker features a story called "Mambo Sauce" in her debut short story collection "Training School for Negro Girls" 
 The event series based out of DC entitled Chicken & Mumbo Sauce

References

External links

American Chinese cuisine
Food and drink in Washington, D.C.
Sauces